The 2008 Rhode Island Republican presidential primary took place on March 4, 2008.

Results

* Candidate dropped out of the race before March 4.

See also
 2008 Republican Party presidential primaries
 2008 Rhode Island Democratic presidential primary

References 

Rhode Island
2008 Rhode Island elections
2008